The Rocket (previously The Rising Sun) is a Grade II listed public house at 120 Euston Road, Euston, London NW1 2AL.

It was built in 1899 by Shoebridge & Rising for the Cannon Brewery.

References

Pubs in the London Borough of Camden
Grade II listed pubs in London
Buildings and structures completed in 1899
19th-century architecture in the United Kingdom
Grade II listed buildings in the London Borough of Camden